Unglaublicher Laerm (English: Incredible Noise) is the second release of Einstürzende Neubauten's Musterhaus project, a series of highly experimental CD releases that were only available via an annual subscription through their website or from shows during their 25th Anniversary Tour. This project was separate from their Neubauten.org Supporter Project, which it ran concurrent to.

The focus of this Musterhaus release was, as the title would suggest, intense noise. A quote from the back of the CD reads:

 "It was not a concert. It was not really music. 

 When you were upstairs, you couldn't hear anything at all, but you could see EN clicking away on laptops (and Blixa screaming in a microphone). The REAL thing was downstairs. You can see the small room on the photos - maybe 20 people could be there at the same time. Because of ear-protection headsets (or your fingers pressed into your ears) it was not about sound. It was about feeling. The massive wave of sound from those speakers (in this small room!) flattened the hairs on the back of my arms and on my head. Sometimes the music came to a DEEP grinding halt. Sometimes Blixa's voice cut through. 
 It was not a wall of sound. A wall is something in front of you. You were INSIDE the sound. The very air you were breathing vibrated. The eyes shook in their sockets. I've never been attacked like this by music. 
 I don't know if this sounds funny in a way, it wasn't. It was incredibly fascinating."

Track listing
 "Laerm 1" – 31:20
 "Laerm 2" – 19:31

Notes
Personnel:
Arbeit / Bargeld / Chudy /Hacke / Moser

 JA: Indian instrumental machines, chaos pad
 BB: samples (EN 2003-2005), vocals, loops
 NU: installation ("The Gopher"), microphone
 AH: feedbacks, field recordings ("N.U. at the scrapyard")
 RM: samples, field recordings, electronic processing

Recorded live 06-03-05 at NBI, Berlin by Rocco Weise
Assisted by Marco Paschke
Edited by Ingo Krauss and Blixa Bargeld
Mastered by Ingo Krauss
Produced by Einstürzende Neubauten

External links
https://web.archive.org/web/20050327070931/http://musterhaus.neubauten.org/

Einstürzende Neubauten albums
2005 albums